Knightfall is a historical fiction drama television series created by Don Handfield and Richard Rayner for the History channel. Filmed in the Czech Republic and Croatia, it premiered on December 6, 2017, in the United States. On August 13, 2018, History renewed the series for a second season, which premiered on March 25, 2019. In May 2020, it was announced that the series had been cancelled.

Knightfall recounts the success, fall, persecution, and suppression of the Knights Templar, as orchestrated by King Philip IV of France on October 13, 1307. The series focuses on the fictional Templar leader Landry du Lauzon, a brave warrior discouraged by the Templars' failures in the Holy Land who is reinvigorated by news that the Holy Grail has resurfaced.

Cast and characters

Main
 Tom Cullen as Landry de Lauzon, a senior brother of the Knights Templar and a veteran of the Crusades, who is a noble, courageous, and headstrong knight who began his service with the Templars as Godfrey's squire – Godfrey tutored and trained him into a skilled and respected warrior monk. After the Siege of Acre, Landry witnesses the failure of the Crusade, the conquest of the Holy Land by the Saracens and the loss of the most-prized relic in all of Christendom: the Holy Grail. 15 years later, Landry has his faith shaken and frustrated by the Order's inactivity, becomes Master and Commander of the Paris Temple after Godfrey's assassination, the subsequent investigation revealing the Grail is now in France. His hope is reignited, and Landry leads his fellow Templars on a journey to uncover the reasons behind his mentor's death and location of the Grail. Harry Webster portrays a young Landry in season 1.
 Jim Carter as Pope Boniface VIII, a warm and avuncular man and a seasoned religious leader, who acts as a stabilizing, incorruptible force within a corrupt medieval world. The Templar Knights value him as their Holy leader, and they're willing to execute his orders without question. Boniface personally appoints Landry the new Master and Commander of the Paris Temple after Godfrey's assassination and entrusts him the mission of finding the Holy Grail, hoping to use it to launch a new Crusade and reclaim the Holy Land. Simon Haines portrays the younger Father Benedetto in season 2. (main season 1, featured season 2)
 Pádraic Delaney as Gawain, the greatest swordsman of the Templar Order who was crippled by a leg injury sustained in the Siege of Acre while protecting Landry. 15 years later, after Godfrey's assassination, he is told by the new Master Landry he can no longer fight. Unable to serve in the field, Landry assigns him as the training master to the Order's initiates, teaching future knights, including the commoner Parsifal. Feeling his heroism is no longer celebrated, he struggles to maintain his loyalty to the Order, just as he struggles to come to terms with his physical limitations. Gawain feels that, of all the Templars, he has the most to gain from the recovery of the Holy Grail, due to its reported ability to heal.
 Simon Merrells as Tancrède de Hauteville, a veteran Templar fiercely loyal to the order. Unlike most Templars, Tancrede was once married, but he gave up married life in order to join the Templars. As the steadfast, brave, and resolute knight who venerates his Templar vows above all else, Tancrede imagines himself as the heir apparent to Godfrey, the Master and Commander of the Paris Temple, although he concedes to Landry following Godfrey's assassination. With the revelation that the Holy Grail is now in France, Tancrede aids and advises Landry on his quest, and comes to understand what his role must be.
 Julian Ovenden as William de Nogaret, King Philip's scheming counsellor, pragmatic lawyer and right-hand man. De Nogaret is unashamedly godless, and a calculating manipulator ahead of his time. He is driven to destroy the power of organized religion, in revenge for his parents being burned at the stake as heretics for practising Catharism. Cool and supremely calculating, De Nogaret is more involved in the quest for the Holy Grail than he appears. He also secretly desires Philip's daughter, Isabella, while seeking to make her the next Queen of England. Freddie Preston portrays a young de Nogaret in season 2.
 Olivia Ross as Queen Joan (season 1), a formidable diplomat and strategist. Joan is a devoted mother who seeks to ensure her children, especially her daughter, marry for love rather than duty like she was to Philip, whom she has grown to fear. She and Philip are friends of Landry after he saved them from being murdered by brigands – against Landry's vows of celibacy, and without Philip's knowledge, the two pursued a secret romance and Joan is secretly pregnant with his child.
 Ed Stoppard as King Philip, known for his good looks (hence the nickname “The Fair”), Philip struggles both as a King and a husband. He seeks to control his family while dealing with the politics and power moves that are an inevitable part of running his kingdom. Philip longs to be a great monarch and to transform France into the greatest power in Europe. He and Joan are friends of Landry after he saved them from being murdered by brigands, and Philip considers him a teacher, confidant and friend (although he is unaware of their secret romance).
 Sabrina Bartlett (main season 1) and Genevieve Gaunt (recurring season 2) as Princess Isabella, Queen Joan and King Philip's daughter. Isabella is a beautiful, energetic and self-aware young woman whose youth belies a capacity to go to extraordinary lengths to get what she wants. Now of legal age, her impending marriage promises a strong political alliance for France.
 Bobby Schofield as Parsifal (season 1), a young peasant farmer who is decent and honest, although is also brash and recklessly brave, aiming to do what he feels is right, even faced with great peril. He was happily engaged to a young woman, Marie, but is left consumed with grief and a desire for vengeance when she is murdered by Godfrey's assassins. Adrift and wanting to pursue her killers, he accepts an offer from Landry to join the Templars.
 Sarah-Sofie Boussnina as Adelina (season 1), a Jewish homeless thief who previously lived in Acre, but was rescued as a child by Landry and the Templars. Now living in France with her father, she is secretly involved with the unknown forces surrounding the Holy Grail.
 Tom Forbes as Prince Louis of France (season 2), King Philip and Queen Joan's eldest son and heir.
 Mark Hamill as Master Talus (season 2), a veteran Templar who trains the initiates at the Chartres Temple.

Recurring

 Nasser Memarzia as Draper, a Templar brother who serves as a doctor
 Marco Zingaro as Doctor Vigevano, the French court's doctor
 Jim High as Ulric, a Templar brother 
 Robert Pugh (season 1) and Matthew Marsh (season 2) as Jacques De Molay, the 23rd and last Grand Master of the Knights Templar
 Peter O'Meara as Berenger, a Templar brother and the Master of the Chartres Temple

Season 1

 Sam Hazeldine as Marcel De Caux/Godfrey, a Templar brother and the Master of the Paris Temple. Godfrey is a mentor and father figure to Landry. 
 Cengiz Dervis as Roland, a brigand
 Adam Levy as Simon, a Jew and Adelina's father (as well as a survivor of Acre)
 Sabrina Barlett as Princess Isabella
 Akin Gazi as Rashid, the leader of the Brotherhood of Light
 Joey Batey as Pierre, a Templar initiate
 Raymond Waring as Daniel
 Ben Bradshaw as Chamberlain Marigny
 Roy McCrerey as Charles, the Royal Steward
 Marcos Franz as Prince Lluis of Catalonia
 Enrique Arce as Rodrigo of Catalonia, the Catalan Ambassador
 Edward Bourne as Nicholas, De Nogaret's assistant
 Oliver Maltman as Robert, Earl of Oxford, the English Ambassador
 Amelia Clarkson as Sophie, Queen Joan's handmaiden
 Claudia Bassols as Queen Elena of Catalonia
 Jack Sandle as Malraux
 Lourdes Faberes as Altani
 Gina McKee as Landry's mother
 Thomas Coombes as Anthony, a Templar
 Ben Lamb as Dominic, a Templar
 Tony Pritchard as Ballard

Season 2

 David Bowles as Gerard, a Templar brother
 Daniel Campbell as Kelton, a Templar initiate who is later admitted as a brother
 Brian Caspe as Angus, a Templar brother
 Michael James as Quentin, a Templar initiate who is later admitted as a brother
 Joseph Ollman as Vasant, a Templar initiate who is later admitted as a brother
 Dean Ridge as Rhone, a Templar initiate who is later admitted as a brother
 Jirí Weingärtner as Othon, a Templar brother
 Stephen Fewell as Archbishop Raymond DeGoth and, later, Pope Clement V
 Claire Cooper as Sister Anne
 Clementine Nicholson as Queen Margaret, the wife of Prince Louis.
 Salóme R. Gunnarsdóttir as Lydia, a victim of Louis' plot
 Louise Bond as Grecia
 Grace Carter as Camille

Notable guests

 Ryan Early as Reynard (season 1), a mercenary in De Nogaret's employ
 James Coombes as Governor De Rouvray of Navarre (season 1)
 Pavel Bezdek as Pascale (season 2)
 Bill Ratner as Raynald (season 2)
 Sam Hoare as Gabriel (season 2), a Lazarist knight
 Ben Starr as Philippe (season 2)

Episodes

Season 1 (2017–18)

Season 2 (2019)

Production

Development
In January 2016, History announced it had picked up Knightfall for a 10-episode straight-to-series, executive produced by Jeremy Renner. The series was conceived by Renner's production partner Don Handfield and Los Angeles-based British writer and journalist Richard Rayner. British writer-producer Dominic Minghella served as showrunner for the first season. Knightfall recounts the fall, persecution, and burning at the stake of the Knights Templar, as orchestrated by King Philip IV of France on October 13, 1307. Minghella said that the Swedish film Arn – The Knight Templar was one of the main inspirations for the series.

A Czech-American co-production presented by History, the first season of Knightfall was developed and produced by A+E Studios. Dominic Minghella, Josh Appelbaum, Andre Nemec, Jeff Pinkner, Scott Rosenberg, Barry Jossen, Jana Bennett, Douglas Mackinnon, Jeremy Renner, Don Handfield, Richard Rayner, and Sonny Postiglione are credited as executive producers, while Philip G. Flores acted as co-executive producer. The season was produced by Michael Wray for the first four episodes and Gideon Amir for the last six episodes. Jason Grote, Alex Shevchenko, David Minkowski and Matthew Stillman acted as co-producers, while David Elliot served as supervising producer.

The production team for the first season includes casting director Debbie McWilliams, costume designer Diana Cilliers, composer Andrew Price, production designer Ondrej Nekvasil, editors Nathan D. Gunn for the first, sixth and tenth episodes, Stephen Mark for the second episode, John Coniglio for the third and seventh episodes, Patrick McMahon for the fourth and eighth episode, Peter Mergus for the fifth and ninth episode, and Joe Sawyer for the fifth and sixth episodes, and cinematographer Christopher Manley.

On August 13, 2018, it was announced that Knightfall was renewed for a second season. Aaron Helbing was hired as executive producer, writer and showrunner for the second season, replacing Dominic Minghella. Knightfall actor Simon Merrells confirmed that Spartacus: Gods of the Arena and Spartacus: War of the Damned director Rick Jacobson was also working on the series. The production hired a number of European directors for the second season, including Samira Radsi and Roel Reiné. The second season consists of eight episodes.

A Czech-American co-production presented by History, the second season of Knightfall was developed and produced by A+E Studios. Aaron Helbing, Josh Appelbaum, Andre Nemec, Jeff Pinkner, Scott Rosenberg, Barry Jossen, Rick Jacobson, Ethan Reiff, Cyrus Voris, Don Handfield, Richard Rayner and Jeremy Renner are credited as executive producers, while Russell Rothberg acted as co-executive producer. The season was produced by Michael Wray for the first three episodes and Nina Heyns for the last five episodes. David Minkowski, Matthew Stillman and Cristina Verano acted as co-producers.

The production team for the second season includes casting director Suzanne Smith, costume designer Diana Cilliers, composer Natalie Holt, production designer Ondrej Nekvasil, editors Garret Donnelly for the first and fifth episodes, Sang Han for the second and sixth episodes, Debby Germino for the third and seventh episodes and Heather Goodwin Floyd for the fourth and eighth episodes, and cinematographers Thomas Yatsko for the first, fourth, fifth and eighth episodes and Boris Mojsovski for the second, third, sixth and seventh episodes.

In May 2020, it was announced that the series had been canceled.

Casting
With the series' renewal, two new main cast members were announced. Mark Hamill was cast as Talus, an old Templar veteran of the Crusades who lived through a decade of captivity in the Middle East, and now tasked with training younger knights. One of his ex-students is Landry, once a master himself but forced to start over after breaking his vows in the first season. Tom Forbes was cast as Prince Louis, the violent and unpredictable son of King Philip.

Genevieve Gaunt was cast in the recurring role of Isabella, King Philip's daughter and on her way to becoming the woman who history would call the "she-wolf of France". Gaunt replaced Sabrina Bartlett, who portrayed the princess in season one. Additional recurring roles include Irish actor Peter O'Meara as Chartres Temple Master Berenger, Underworld: Blood Wars actress Clementine Nicholson as Princess Margaret, Prince Louis's wife, and Claire Cooper as Sister Anne.

Filming

Production started with three days of filming during the last week of June 2016 in Dubrovnik on Croatia's southern Adriatic coast, with Douglas Mackinnon (Outlander) as director. Set mainly around the Walls of Dubrovnik's Fort Lovrijenac (St. Lawrence Fortress) and the bay of Pile, these scenes depict The Siege of Acre. PAKT Media offered their services, and over 140 Croatian film workers were involved with the production.

Mackinnon served as the principal director, handling most episodes. Metin Hüseyin and David Petrarca (Game of Thrones) also directed a block each. Knightfall was shot primarily in Prague, Czech Republic, with its base at the Barrandov Studios. Several exteriors imitating medieval Paris were built in surrounding suburbs and villages, including Průhonice, and Doksany. Streets in Old Town and Švihov Castle were utilized. Filming started on July 8. According to Barrandov CEO Petr Tichý, the studio was chosen partially based on the quality of the 15th-century interior they had previously built for Borgia. According to Tom Cullen, the main cast had a two-and-a-half week "boot camp" with French stuntman and fight choreographer Cédric Proust. Cullen had taken fencing classes in the past, but had not swung a sword in eight years. The total cost for the season was CZK 1.1 billion.

On August 26, 2016, a fire broke out at the backlot of Barrandov Studios, destroying the exterior sets for Knightfall, with an estimated damage of 100 million CZK (US$4.5 million). Only a small part of the set, representing a medieval city, was saved. The following Monday, shooting resumed at another location in the city. The fire affected the production schedule, but the production was not to be moved to another city, and would focus on street locations. David Minkowski, a senior producer at Stillking Films, added, "In conjunction with our insurers and Barrandov construction, we are planning to rebuild the destroyed backlot set as soon as possible and complete filming in Czech Republic,. Filming for the first season wrapped in mid-December 2016.

The filming of the second season wrapped on December 19, 2018.

Other locations in the Czech Republic that were used for filming the series included the Doksany Monastery, Točník Castle, Kost Castle near Libošovice, Zvíkov Castle and the Medieval Open-Air Řepora museum.

Release
A teaser trailer debuted on February 1, 2017, on History Channel, depicting a bloody Templar helmet. The series premiered on December 6, 2017. The second season premiered on March 25, 2019.

The series was pre-sold to SBS in Australia. HBO, its subsidiary Cinemax, and FilmBox Premium also obtained the rights in central and eastern Europe. History, which developed the original series, aired Knightfall in North America.

Reception

Critical reception
On review aggregation website Rotten Tomatoes, season 1 had an approval rating of 55% based on 20 reviews. On Metacritic, the series has a weighted average score of 47 out of 100, based on reviews from 12 critics, indicating "mixed or average reviews".

For the second season, Rotten Tomatoes listed only four reviews, with three favorable; two of the reviews praised the addition of Mark Hamill with one commenting that "the barely recognizable Star Wars icon carries every scene in which he appears".

On the self proclaimed "Community Watchdog" website, Things You Should Be Told, Knightfall was listed as second on the list of "Entertaining but Historically Inaccurate Movies & Series of All Time". Its ranking as Historically Inaccurate was second only to the movie Braveheart which coincidentally covers the same general time period and overlapping historical events and people.

Accolades
Knightfall was nominated for Best Fantasy Television Series at the 44th Saturn Awards.

Other media 
In May 2017, it was announced that A+E Networks had partnered with Titan Publishing to develop original novels and an eight-part comic book series based on the series. In 2019, a tie-in novel based on the series, The Infinite Deep, was released by author David B Coe.

References

External links 
 
 Official podcast
 

2010s American drama television series
2017 American television series debuts
2019 American television series endings
American action television series
American adventure television series
Costume drama television series
Czech action television series
English-language television shows
History (American TV channel) original programming
Holy Grail
Period television series
Serial drama television series
Television series about the Crusades
Television series set in the Middle Ages
Knights Templar in popular culture
Television shows scored by Natalie Holt
Czech historical television series
Czech adventure television series